The 1999 Central Michigan Chippewas football team was an American football team that represented Central Michigan University in the Mid-American Conference (MAC) during the 1999 NCAA Division I-A football season. In their sixth and final season under head coach Dick Flynn, the Chippewas compiled a 4–7 record (3–5 against MAC opponents), finished in fifth place in the MAC's West Division, and were outscored by their opponents, 344 to 229. The team played its home games in Kelly/Shorts Stadium in Mount Pleasant, Michigan, with attendance of 89,698 in five home games.

The team's statistical leaders included Pete Shepherd with 2,295 passing yards, Eric Flowers with 766 rushing yards, and Jammarl O'Neal with 1,085 receiving yards. O'Neal became only the second Central Michigan player to total over 1,000 receiving yards. Defensive tackle Joe Adam was selected as the team's most valuable player.

On November 9, Flynn announced his resignation as Central Michigan's head coach, effective after the final two games of the season. He had been with Central Michigan for 22 years, including the final six years as the head football coach. Flynn compiled a 28–37 record as head coach.

Schedule

References

Central Michigan
Central Michigan Chippewas football seasons
Central Michigan Chippewas football